The Cooperative Investigation of the Caribbean and Adjacent Regions (CICAR) is an Intergovernmental Oceanographic Commission of UNESCO (IOC/UNESCO), a 15-nations cooperative scientific effort, which is intended to conduct oceanography operations and cooperation programs in the Gulf of Mexico and the Caribbean sea in the following themes:

 physical,
 fisheries,
 marine biology,
 geology,
 geophysics,
 meteorology.

References

Office of Oceanic and Atmospheric Research
UNESCO